Nick Sandow (born August 3, 1966) is an American actor, writer, producer and director, best known for his role as Joe Caputo in Orange Is the New Black.

Early life
Of Italian descent, Sandow grew up in the Italian neighborhood of Van Nest in the Bronx. He moved to Manhattan around age 19 to study acting under William Esper in the Two-Year Professional Actor Training Program and work in theater.

Career
Sandow has worked extensively in television guest starring on many television series such as Law & Order, Third Watch, NYPD Blue, Boardwalk Empire, and Blue Bloods. His most notable acting role on Orange Is the New Black, as prison administrator Joseph Caputo, was originally supposed to have been for a handful of episodes for the shows first season, but his role was expanded during the second season and was made a series regular with the third season.

He began his directing career in theater on Off-Off-Broadway. In 2015 he wrote, directed and acted in The Wannabe. The film premiered at the Tribeca Film Festival and later got a wider release.

Filmography

Film

Television

Theatre
 Halfway Home, Theatre at St. Clements, New York, 1999
 Baptism By Fire, Studio Dante, New York City, 2004
 Henry Flamethrow, Studio Dante, New York City, 2005 (Director)

References

External links
 
 Movie Reviews

Living people
1966 births
American people of Italian descent
Male actors from New York City
American male film actors
American male stage actors
American male television actors
Television producers from New York City
Writers from the Bronx
American television directors